Ludwig Hemmer (? - 1925) was a German printer and graphic artist in Hanover. The versatile entrepreneur, photographer and publisher of numbered postcards distributed his works produced in collotype under the name "L. Hemmer".

Life 
The Graphische Kunstanstalt was founded in 1876 by a Mr Hammers († 1899). In 1897, Hemmer became a partner in the company, which then traded as "Hammers & Hemmer". In 1902, Hammers was no longer named when the firm was mentioned. In Paul Siedentopf's ...Buch der alten Firmen... (see further reading), next to the company logo "LH" in a square are the headings "Ludwig Hemmer, Graphische Kunstanstalt / collotype, prints, clichés, Designs, drawings, commercial art, advertising art" and as address Arnswaldtstraße 13, which was created as a street in 1888.

Buerschaper" and addressed to the family August Reese.

After Hemmer's death, the company became Walter Hemmer in 1925.

Work 
Similar to his Hanoverian colleague Karl Friedrich Wunder, Hemmer also produced 
 a still unexplored number of numbered, partly also colorized picture postcards. So far, numbering greater than 600 could be identified.
 an unknown number of picture postcards without numbering.

Hemmer's Kunstanstalt provided the printing blocks of the text illustrations.
 Die Kunstdenkmäler der Provinz Hannover, edition commissioned by the Provincial Commission for the Research and Preservation of Monuments in the Province of Hanover by Dr. phil. , Stadtbaurat, vol. III (Regierungsbezirk Lüneburg), 1.

References

Further reading 

External links 

19th-century German photographers
20th-century German photographers
19th-century publishers (people)
20th-century publishers (people)
19th-century births
1925 deaths
Place of birth missing